Jackson Carey Frank (March 2, 1943 – March 3, 1999) was an American folk musician. He released his first and only album in 1965, produced by Paul Simon. After the release of the record, Frank was plagued by a series of personal issues, and was diagnosed with schizophrenia and protracted depression that prevented him from maintaining his career.

Frank spent his later life homeless and destitute, and died in 1999 from a combination of pneumonia and cardiac arrest. Though he only released one record, he has been cited as an influence by many singer-songwriters, including Paul Simon, Sandy Denny, Bert Jansch and Nick Drake. Rolling Stone journalist David Fricke called Frank "one of the best forgotten songwriters of the 1960s."

Biography

Early life
Frank was born Jackson Carey Jones on March 2, 1943, in Buffalo, New York, the only child of Marilyn Rochefort Jones and Jack Jones, a test pilot. He later took on the surname of his stepfather, Elmer Frank, an army officer and food chemist.

On March 31, 1954, when Frank was eleven years old, a furnace exploded at his school, Cleveland Hill Elementary School in Cheektowaga, New York. The fire killed fifteen of his fellow students, including Marlene du Pont, Frank's then girlfriend, about whom he would later write the song "Marlene". Frank survived, but had burns to over fifty percent of his body. The trauma from the burns also caused extensive damage to his parathyroid glands, resulting in an unregulated buildup of calcium in his body that led to extensive joint problems.

During his hospital stay he was introduced to music when a teacher, Charlie Castelli, brought Frank an acoustic guitar to keep him occupied during the recovery. He was influenced greatly by Elvis Presley as a teenager. In 1957, he traveled to Memphis, Tennessee with his mother to meet Elvis at a meet-and-greet event for the children injured in the Cleveland Hill fire. In 1961, he enrolled at Gettysburg College and began majoring in journalism, but his studies were cut short as he dropped out after a year. When he was 21, he received an insurance payout of $110,500 ($ today) for his injuries, enough for him to move to England.

Debut album
His eponymous 1965 album, Jackson C. Frank, was produced by Paul Simon while the two of them were living in England immersed in the burgeoning local folk scene. The album was recorded in six hours at Levy's Recording Studio, located at 103 New Bond Street in London. Frank was so shy during the recording that he asked to be shielded by screens so that Paul Simon, Art Garfunkel, and Al Stewart could not see him, claiming: 'I can't play. You're looking at me.' The best-known track from the sessions, "Blues Run the Game", was covered by Simon and Garfunkel, and later by Wizz Jones, Counting Crows, John Mayer, Mark Lanegan, Headless Heroes, Colin Meloy, Bert Jansch, Eddi Reader, Laura Marling and Robin Pecknold (as White Antelope), while Nick Drake also recorded it privately. The song was also heard in the 2018 film The Old Man & the Gun, while his song "Milk and Honey" was heard in the 2003 film The Brown Bunny. "Milk and Honey" was also covered by Fairport Convention, Nick Drake, and Sandy Denny, whom he dated for a while. During their relationship, Jackson convinced Sandy to give up her nursing profession to concentrate on music full time.

Although Frank was well received in England for a while, in 1966 things took a turn for the worse as his mental health began to unravel. Frank's mental health declined so noticeably and completely that in early 1966 he entered St. John's Hospital in Lincoln for an evaluation. At the same time he began to experience writer's block. As his insurance payment was on the verge of running out he decided to go back to the United States for two years. When he returned to England in 1968 he seemed a different person to his friends. His depression, stemming from the childhood trauma of the classroom fire, had grown worse, and he had completely lost whatever little self-confidence he once possessed. Al Stewart recalled:

Woodstock
While in Woodstock, he married Elaine Sedgwick, an English former fashion model and a cousin to Andy Warhol's protégé Edie Sedgwick. They had a son and later a daughter, Angeline. After his son died of cystic fibrosis, Frank went into a period of even greater depression and was ultimately committed to a mental institution. By the early 1970s, Frank began to beg aid from friends. In 1975, Karl Dallas wrote an enthusiastic piece in the British weekly music newspaper Melody Maker, and in 1978, Frank's 1965 album was re-released as Jackson Again, with a new cover sleeve, although this did not in the end make his music much more popular outside of a small number of his fans.

Later life and death
Frank lived with his parents in Elma, New York for a few years in the early 1980s. In 1984, his mother, who had been in hospital for open-heart surgery, returned home to find Frank missing with no note or forwarding address. Frank had gone to New York City in a desperate bid to find Paul Simon, but ended up homeless and sleeping on the sidewalk. During this time he found himself in and out of various psychiatric institutions.

Frank was treated for paranoid schizophrenia, a diagnosis that was denied by Frank himself (he maintained that he had depression caused by the trauma he had experienced as a child). Just as Frank's prospects seemed to be at their worst, a fan from the Woodstock area, Jim Abbott, discovered him in the early 1990s. Abbott had been discussing music with Mark Anderson, a teacher at the local college he was attending. The conversation had turned to folk music, which they both enjoyed, when Abbott asked the teacher if he had heard of Frank. He recollected:

Frank, who had known Anderson from their days at Gettysburg College, had decided to write him to ask if there was anywhere in Woodstock he could stay after he had made up his mind to leave New York City. Abbott phoned Frank, and then organized a temporary placement for him at a senior citizens' home in Woodstock. Abbott was stunned by what he saw when he found Frank in New York:

Soon after this, Frank found himself sitting on a bench in Queens while awaiting his move to Woodstock, when he was shot with a pellet gun and blinded through his left eye. At first the shooter could not be found, but it was later determined that local kids had been firing the pellet gun indiscriminately at people, and Frank happened to be in the wrong place at the wrong time.

Abbott then promptly helped him move to Woodstock. During this time, Frank began recording some demos of new songs. Frank's resurfacing led to the first CD release of his self-titled album. In later pressings, Frank's demos from the 1970s were included as a bonus disc with the album, and an anthology entitled Blues Run the Game contained all these tracks as well as his final demos made in the 1990s. In 2014 Forest of Eden, an album of Frank's unreleased demos, was released through London based record label Secret Records. The collection includes his unheard song "Forest of Eden", alongside 1950s demo recordings of "Heartbreak Hotel"; two Christmas songs, called "Santa Bring My Baby Back To Me" and "Precious Lord" (with a spoken word greeting to his grandparents); and three home-recorded demos of his original songs made prior to his 1965 album. These original song demos are of "I Want To Be Alone", "Here Comes The Blues", and "You Never Wanted Me". The only available recordings of Frank yet to be officially released are songs made for the BBC Radio 1 show Nightride in 1968, but they only exist as poor quality off-air sources.

Frank died in Great Barrington, Massachusetts, from a combination of pneumonia and cardiac arrest, on March 3, 1999, at the age of 56.

Legacy

Though he never achieved fame during his lifetime, his songs have been covered by many well-known artists, including Simon and Garfunkel, John Mayer, Counting Crows, Nick Drake, Sandy Denny, Julie Felix, Bert Jansch, John Renbourn, Laura Marling, Chromatics, and Robin Pecknold. Nick Drake covered 4 songs from Frank's debut album; "Here Come the Blues", "Blues Run the Game", "Milk & Honey", and "Kimbie". These are found on Drake's posthumous release, Family Tree. Frank's song "I Want To Be Alone", also known as "Dialogue," appeared on the soundtrack for the film Daft Punk's Electroma. Soulsavers covered "Blues Run the Game" on their single "Revival" (7" vinyl, April 30, 2007). Marianne Faithfull covered Frank's arrangement of the traditional song "Kimbie" on her 2008 album Easy Come, Easy Go and included the song in the repertoire of her 2009 tour. Erland & The Carnival covered "My Name Is Carnival," apparently Frank's favourite song. Bert Jansch also covered this song as a gesture to Frank.

Sandy Denny covered "You Never Wanted Me" and "Milk and Honey" on the album It's Sandy Denny released by Saga Eros in 1970. Her song, "Next Time Around," contains coded references to Frank, her ex-boyfriend. "Marcy's Song" is played by Patrick, John Hawkes' character, in the 2011 film Martha Marcy May Marlene, and "Marlene" plays in the closing credits. Laura Barton's BBC Radio 4 programme Blues Run the Game, first broadcast November 20, 2012, included interviews with Al Stewart, John Renbourn, Jim Abbott and John Kay as well as archive material of Jackson C. Frank talking and singing.

South Korean jazz singer Na Yoon-sun covered "My Name Is Carnival" on her 2010 album Same Girl. Frank's song "Milk and Honey" featured on the soundtrack of Vincent Gallo's 2003 movie The Brown Bunny (and prominently in the movie's trailer). It was also sampled by Hidden Orchestra in their track "The Burning Circle" and by Hip Hop artist Nas in his track "Undying Love". French singer and Kora player Stranded Horse (Yann Tambour) covered "My Name Is Carnival" on his 2016 album Luxe. The popular American TV series This Is Us features "Blues Run the Game" in episode three, which first aired on October 11, 2016.

Alt-country band Son Volt covered "Yellow Walls" in 2017. A previously lost song from his 1968 period called "Golden Mirror" was uploaded to YouTube in late 2017. "Blues Run the Game" is featured in the 2018 film The Old Man & the Gun. Colin Meloy performed "Blues Run The Game" in the 2013 musical/documentary Another Day, Another Time: Celebrating the music of "Inside Llewyn Davis" and in 2017 Brazilian film "Araby". "Horseshoe Crabs," a song on Hop Along's 2015 album Painted Shut, was inspired by the events of Frank's later life. "Just Like Anything" was covered by Malcolm Middleton (Arab Strap) on his 2008 album Sleight Of Heart. The electronic music band Chromatics did a cover of "I Want To Be Alone" in 2019

"My Name Is Carnival" is briefly played in the 2019 film Joker. In a later scene, Joaquin Phoenix's character, Arthur, says, "I heard this song on the radio the other day, and the guy was singing that his name was Carnival. Which is crazy, because that’s my clown name at work." "Blues Run the Game" is featured on season 2, episode "Subterranean Fire" of Tin Star in 2019, and season 1 episode 5 ("Time of the Monkey") on Poker Face in 2023. "Blues Run the Game" is featured on season 2, episode 7 of Britannia in 2019. Joshua Lee Turner covered "Blues Run The Game" on his YouTube channel in late 2018.

David Balfe's project For Those I Love samples the main hook from "Cryin' like baby" on the eponymous debut album's final track Leave Me Not Alone.  The album's themes concentrate on youth, friendship and grief, using the lyrical sample to convey the artist's feelings upon learning of the death of his best friend.

Discography

Studio albums
 Jackson C. Frank (1965)

Reissues and compilations
 Jackson Again, vinyl 1978, CD 1996, vinyl & CD 2001, 2 CD 2003
 Blues Run the Game (2003) 2 CD Anthology containing all (then) available recordings
 Forest of Eden (2013) (previously unreleased tracks and demos) from Secret Records
 Jackson C. Frank (2014) Earth Recordings
 Fixin to Die (2014) more previously unreleased tracks and demos
 Jackson C. Frank: The Complete Recordings (2015)
 Jackson C. Frank: American Troubadour  (2020)

Singles
 "Blues Run the Game" / "Can't Get Away From My Love" (1965, 7")

Filmography
 Blues Run the Game, a documentary by Damien Aimé Dupont (Burning Rooster Productions)

References

Notes

Sources

External links

Official page of the documentary "Blues Run the Game"
Jackson C. Frank homepage
Jackson C Frank Complete Discography at the Folk Blues & Beyond website
Jackson C Frank tribute album project

1943 births
1999 deaths
20th-century American guitarists
20th-century American male singers
20th-century American singers
American folk guitarists
American folk singers
American male singer-songwriters
Burn survivors
Deaths from pneumonia in Massachusetts
Fingerstyle guitarists
Homeless people
Musicians from Buffalo, New York
People from Woodstock, New York
People with mood disorders
People with schizophrenia
Singer-songwriters from New York (state)